Ira Singhal is an Indian Administrative Service officer and computer science engineer. She was the highest-scoring individual in the UPSC's Civil Services Examination for the year 2014. She completed her B.Tech. from Netaji Subhas Institute of Technology, University of Delhi and MBA from FMS Delhi. Singhal topped the exam in her fourth attempt, to become the first differently abled woman to top the civil services exam.

Early life and education 
Singhal was born in Meerut to Rajendra Singhal and Anita Singhal. Her father is an engineer and mother is an insurance advisor. She was among the toppers at Sophia Girls School, Meerut and Loreto Convent School, Delhi.

Ira has scoliosis, a spine-related disorder, which disrupts her arm movement. She completed her schooling from the Army Public School, Dhaula Kuan and studied Computer Engineering from Netaji Subhas Institute of Technology (now Netaji Subhas University of Technology NSUT) and received Dual MBA in Marketing & Finance from Faculty of Management Studies, University of Delhi. She scored 1,082 marks out of a total 2,025 and secured 53.43% in UPSC Exam 2014-2015.

Career 
Despite clearing the toughest exam in her very first attempt, Singhal was not allowed to take the position in office due to her physical disability as authorities cited her inability to push, pull and lift. She was refused a posting because she has scoliosis. In 2012 she filed a case in the Central Administrative Tribunal (CAT) and won after four years, after which she was given a posting as Assistant Commissioner in Indian Revenue Service (C&CE). Singhal gave the civil service examination in 2010, 2011, 2013 and 2014 and in the first three attempts she got Indian Revenue Service whereas in 2015 she got Indian Administrative Service (IAS).

After MBA, before appearing for Civil Services Examination in 2010, she worked as a Strategy Manager in Cadbury India and as marketing intern at the Coca-Cola Company. She has also taught Spanish for a year. She is posted as Assistant Collector (trainee) in the Government of Delhi since June 2016.

She is the Brand Ambassador for Department of Disability, Ministry of Social Justice and Empowerment, Government of India. She is also one of the brand ambassadors for Ministry of Women and Child Development & NITI Aayog and is on the National Panel for Accessible Elections, Election Commission of India. She has also been a part of the Designing of Central Board of Secondary Education (CBSE) Examination Policy with regard to children with disabilities. Her awards include India Today’s Woman of the Year 2015, President's Gold Medal for Topping the IAS Training, First Ladies of India Award by the Ministry of Women and Child Development, Government of India. She is also recorded in the Limca Book of Records.

She has been a speaker on wide-ranging issues like education, disability, gender issues, skill development, career counselling, etc. at more than 500 international and national conferences, industry forums, universities, colleges and other top institutions of the country including IIMs and IITs. She has been working towards various social causes including empowerment of persons with disabilities, empowerment and promotion of Transgender community, women empowerment, prevention of child labour and child marriages, prevention of illegal conversion of green lands, promoting green energy, skill development, promotion of mental health and promotion of khadi and indigenous fabrics. She rescued around 340 child and bonded labourers and restored them to their families, within 1 year in her first posting as SDM (Sub-Divisional Magistrate), Alipur in North Delhi district. She is also the first person to give a job to a transgender person full-time employment in a government office in Delhi.

References 

Living people
Indian civil servants
Indian women activists
People from Meerut
Women from Uttar Pradesh
1983 births
Faculty of Management Studies – University of Delhi alumni
Delhi University alumni